Common names: Shaba bush viper,Spawls S, Branch B. 1995. The Dangerous Snakes of Africa. Ralph Curtis Books. Dubai: Oriental Press. 192 pp. . Katanga Mountain bush viper,more.

Atheris katangensis is a species of venomous viper found in the eastern Democratic Republic of the Congo and in Zambia. No subspecies are currently recognized.

Description
It attains a maximum total length (body + tail) of only , making this the smallest member of the genus Atheris.

The head is flat, triangular, distinct from the neck, and covered with small keeled scales. The snout is rounded. Midbody there are 24–31 rows of dorsal scales. The tail is short. Males and females have 45–59 and 38–42 subcaudal scales respectively.

The color pattern consists of a purple-brown or yellow-brown ground color, overlaid with paired dorsolateral lines of a contrasting shade. These lines may break into a zigzag pattern and run from head to tail. The belly is yellowish, as is the tip of the tail.

Common names
Shaba bush viper, Katanga Mountain bush viper, Upemba bush viper, Katanga bush viper, Katanga tree viper.

Geographic range
It is found in the Upemba National Park, Katanga Province (Shaba Province) in the eastern Democratic Republic of the Congo and in Zambia.

The type locality given is "Mubale-Munte (région du confluent), sous-affluent de la rive droite de la Lufira [alt. 1480], Park National de l'Upemba".

Habitat
Gallery forest along rivers at altitudes between 1,200 and 1,500 meters (about 4,000–5,000 ft).

References

Further reading
de Witte G-F. 1953. Exploration du Parc National de l'Upemba. Mission G.F. de Witte en collaboration avec W. Adam, A. Janssens, L. van Meel et R. Verheyen (1946–1949). Fascicule 6: Reptiles. Brussels: Institut des Parcs Nationaux du Congo Belge. 322 pp. + 111 figures, 38 plates, 3 color plates, 1 map. (Atheris katangensis, p. 301).

katangensis
Snakes of Africa
Reptiles of the Democratic Republic of the Congo
Reptiles of Zambia
Reptiles described in 1953
Taxa named by Gaston-François de Witte